Gair is a 1999 Indian action film starring Ajay Devgn, Raveena Tandon, Reena Roy, Amrish Puri and Paresh Rawal, directed by Ashok Gaikwad.

Plot summary

A child left on the steps of a temple is adopted by a rich man. The child grows up to be rich and successful and generates hatred and envy by others.

Vijay (Ajay Devgan) an illegitimate orphan grows up to be a rich industrialist with his hard work. He falls in love with Madhu (Raveena Tandon) who is retired judge Amarnath's (Satyen Kapoor) only daughter. Their love blossoms. Raja (Ajinkya Deo) who is industrialist Oberoi's (Amrish Puri) son too falls for Madhu, but when Oberoi goes to ask for Madhu's hand he finds out that before him Vijay had approached for Madhu's hand. Oberoi sides Vijay's proposal, in fact Mr. Oberoi always best owed his special liking towards Vijay. He even treated him as his own son. This became the reason of conflict between his wife Sharda (Reena Roy), his brother-in-law (Paresh Rawal), and his son Raja. Vijay was even accused to be the illegitimate son of Mr. Oberoi. Jagat Poisoned Amarnath's mind about getting his daughter married to a bastard. The love of Vijay and Madhu was shattered but Vijay fights for his love.

Cast
 Ajay Devgn as Vijay Kumar, An Angry Young Man / Dev, Vijay Kumar's Father and Sharda Oberoi's Boyfriend (Double Role)
Raveena Tondon as Madhu, Vijay Kumar's Love Interest
 Amrish Puri as C.K. Oberoi, Vijay Kumar's Step Father
 Reena Roy as Sharda Oberoi a.k.a. Mrs Oberoi, Vijay Kumar's Mother and C.K. Oberoi's wife
 Paresh Rawal as Jagat mama, Sharda Oberoi's elder brother
 Kiran Kumar as Union Leader Sampat
 Ajinkya Deo as Raja Oberoi, son of C.K.Oberoi

Soundtrack
The soundtrack on Audio Cassettes was released in 1995 with its earlier name 'Shaktishaali'. But then CDs were released again at the time of film's release with updated title 'Gair'.

References

External links

1999 films
1990s Hindi-language films
Films scored by Anand–Milind
Indian crime action films
Films directed by Ashok Gaikwad
1990s crime action films